Suuksu or Suuk-su is a cape on the southern coast of Crimea, Ukraine between the town Gurzuf and western slopes of Mount Ayu-Dag (Bear Mountain). On top of the cape is an early medieval cemetery. Excavation of the cemetery began in 1903 and turned up a variety of jewelry, dishes and weapons.

The cemetery was named for the cape, which it is located. In the Crimean Tatar language, it means cold water (suvuq - cold, suv - water).

History of Crimea
Headlands of Crimea
Headlands of Ukraine